The 2012–13 season of the Regionalliga was the 54th season of the third-tier football league in Austria, since its establishment in 1959.

The league is composed of 48 teams divided into three groups of 16 teams each, whose teams are divided geographically (Eastern, Central and Western). Teams play only other teams in their own division.

Regionalliga East

Regionalliga Central

Regionalliga West

External links
Regionalliga Ost 
Regionalliga Mitte 
Regionalliga West 

Austrian Regionalliga seasons
Austria
3